"Take You Higher" is a song by the British record producer Wilkinson. It was released on 24 March 2013, through RAM Records, as the second single from his debut album Lazers Not Included. The single includes the AA-side song "Crunch", which is not included on the album, and remixes from Jakwob and Foamo. The song has peaked at number 35 on the UK Dance Chart, four places higher that its previous single "Need to Know", yet the song failed to make an entry on the UK Singles Chart. Although, the song has managed to chart at number 21 in the UK Independent Chart and at number 14 in the Dance Bubbling Under chart in Belgium.

Track listing

Chart performance

Weekly charts

Release history

References

Wilkinson (musician) songs
2013 songs
2013 singles
RAM Records singles